Caherbarnagh is a  mountain in County Cork, Ireland. It is part of the Boggeragh Mountains.

See also
List of mountains in Ireland

References

Hewitts of Ireland
Marilyns of Ireland
Mountains and hills of County Cork
Mountains under 1000 metres